The Barber of Seville is a 1938 German-Spanish musical film directed by Benito Perojo and starring Miguel Ligero, Estrellita Castro, and Roberto Rey.

The film's sets were designed by Gustav A. Knauer.

Cast
 Miguel Ligero as Bartolo
 Estrellita Castro as Zigeunerin
 Roberto Rey as Figaro
 Pedro Barreto as Tabernero
 Manuel Collado
 J. Noé de la Peña as Sargento
 José Escandel as Polizonte
 Pedro Fernández Cuenca as Coronel
 Anselmo Fernández
 Tina Gascó as Susanna
 Fernando Granada as Conde de Almaviva
 Joaquín Reig as Notario
 Raquel Rodrigo as Rosina
 Alberto Romea as Don Basilio

See also
 The Barber of Seville, 1775 play

References

Bibliography

External links 
 

1938 musical films
German musical films
Spanish musical films
1938 films
1930s Spanish-language films
Films directed by Benito Perojo
Films set in Seville
Films based on The Barber of Seville (play)
German black-and-white films
Spanish black-and-white films
1930s German films